Valeč is a municipality and village in Karlovy Vary District in the Karlovy Vary Region of the Czech Republic. It has about 300 inhabitants. The village centre is well preserved and is protected by law as an urban monument zone.

Administrative parts
Villages of Jeřeň, Kostrčany, Nahořečice and Velký Hlavákov are administrative parts of Valeč.

Geography
It lies in the Doupov Mountains.

Etymology
The name is derived from Válek (a variation of the name Valentin), who resided here.

History

The first written mention of Valeč is from 1358, when Valeč was divided between brothers Beneš and Ctibor of Valeč. Other owners of the estate during the Middle Ages were: Jan Kladivo of Stebno 1368; Boreš of Osek 1371; Beneš of Buskovice from 1377 to 1416; Nevlas and Jan of Doupov 1416; Sezema of Doupov 1454; and Jan of Doupov of 1487.

The village was given municipal rights December 1514, upon a request by Vladislaus II. In 1570 Christopher Štampach of Štampach bought Valeč. Václav Štampach of Štampach then built a Renaissance castle, whose appearance today is not known. After Václav Štampach joined the Bohemian Revolt and in 1622 left the country, the castle was confiscated. However, in 1623, Valeč was bought by Barbora Štampachová of Poutnov.

The castle underwent significant change in the time of Prince Johann Christoph Kager at the turn of the 17th and 18th century. In this period, the Renaissance castle was converted to a square two-story Baroque castle, led by architects Francesco Barelli, Antonio Bianno Rossa and after his death, John Christopher Tyll. He also laid out the castle garden, equipped it with theater, cascading fountain and sculptures by the renowned Matthias Braun. Near the castle is the Church of the Holy Trinity built by the architect G. A. Biana Rossou in the years 1710–1728. In its courtyard is also located the Holy Trinity Column by František Maxmilián Kaňka, created in 1725.

In the 18th century Valeč was occupied by Jan Ferdinand Kager of Globen beginning in 1721, and then Jan Antonín Pegen of Perga, the Czech Austrian Minister. Although he only owned it for a year, he heavily indebted the estate through costly remodeling.

The castle underwent several modifications in the Neo-Renaissance and Neo-Baroque style. That is credited mainly to Earl Vincent Thurn Valssasin between 1895 and 1896. In 1937, Jan Larisch-Mönnich purchased Valeč, repairing the roof and cracks in the walls, and installing central heating. In 1945, based on the Beneš decrees, the palace was confiscated and handed over to the management of the organization of political prisoners. In 1947 the Ministry of Agriculture allocated it to the Central Directorate of State Forests and Farms and it was then used as a home for Korean children and from the early fifties as a children's home. After a fire on 2 April 1976, the regional conservation centre in Plzeň took over management of the palace. Reconstruction of the building, began in the 1990s and continues to today.

Twin towns – sister cities

Valeč is twinned with:
 Drebach, Germany

Valeč also have friendly relations with Neckargemünd in Germany and with Valeč (Třebíč District).

References

External links

Valeč Castle

Villages in Karlovy Vary District